Phoenix Project may refer to:

 Phoenix Project (Pentagon), a part of the Pentagon Renovation Program
 The Phoenix Project (film), a 2015 film directed by Tyler Graham Pavey
 The Phoenix Project: Shifting from Oil to Hydrogen, a book by Harry Braun
 Project Phoenix (SETI) or Phoenix Project, a search for extraterrestrial intelligence in radio signal patterns

See also 
 Project Phoenix (disambiguation)
 Operation Phoenix (disambiguation)